K. P. A. C. Sunny (1934–2006) was an Indian actor in Malayalam movies. He acted in more than 400 Malayalam films. He occupied the movie industry for four decades.

Background
Sunny was born as Sunny D'Cruz in Chavara, Kollam on 18 April 1934. His father's name is Jacob. He completed his education at Chavara English Medium High School and graduated from Fatima Mata National College, Kollam. He established as a good actor while at school, where he also scripted a drama titled Sneham Anaswaramanu. He was elected as College Arts Club Secretary during college life. He also worked in Kala Nilayam. He worked as an Accountant in State Small Scale Agricultural Corporation from 1964. After joining K.P.A.C drama troupe he adopted K.P.A.C as a prefix for his name. In 2004, he received the Kerala Sangeetha Nataka Akademi Award for Drama.

Sunny died from a heart attack on 18 April 2006, which was his 72nd birthday. He was survived by his wife Mercy and two daughters.

Filmography

 Five Fingers (2005)
 Rapid Action Force (2000) as CI Jacob
 Ezhupunna Tharakan (1999) as Matthew
 Shobhanam (1997)
 Peter Scott (1995)
 Achan Kompathu Amma Varampathu (1995)
 The King (1995)
 Vendor Daniel State Licency (1994)
 Commissioner (1994)
 Moonnaam Loka Pattaalam(1994)
 Varaphalam (1994)
 Thalamura (1999)
 Journalist (1993)
 Saakshaal Sreemaan Chaathunni (1993)
 Kulapathi (1993)
Kauravar  (1992)
 Ennodu Ishtam Koodamo (1992)
 Kizhakkan Pathrose (1992)
 Mahanagaram (1992)
 Priyapetta Kukku (1992)
 Kunukkitta Kozhi (1992)
 Thalastaanam (1992)
 Onnaam Muhoortham (1991) as Shekhara Kurup
 Aanaval Mothiram (1991)
 Chakravarthi (1991)
 Oru Prathyeka Ariyippu'' (1991) as SP Rajasekharan
 Nayam Vyakthamakkunnu as Sadasivan
 Bhoomika (1991)
Mahassar (1991) as Judge
 Vacation (1990)
 Kadathanadan Ambadi (1990)
 Maanmizhiyaal (1990)
 Lal Salam (1990)
 No.20 Madras Mail (1990)
 Indrajaalam (1990)
 Veena Meettiya Vilangukal (1990)
 Naale Ennundenkil (1990)
 Ee Thanutha Veluppan Kalathu (1990)
 Arhatha (1990)
 Naduvazhikal (1989)
 News (1989)
 Agnipravesham (1989)
 Adikkuruppu (1989) Karthikeyan
 Isabella (1988)
 Dhwani (1988)
 Vida Parayaan Maathram (1988)
 Ambalakkara Panchaayath (1988)
 Inquilabinte Puthri (1988)
 Mukthi (1988)
 August 1 (1988)
 Oru CBI Diary Kurippu (1988)
 Aparan (1988)
 Bhoomiyile Rajakkanmar (1987)
 Vrutham (1987) as Barristor Menon
 Theertham (1987)
 Aalippazhangal (1987) as Dr. Madhavan
 Irupatham Noottandu (1987)
 Swaami Shree Naraayana Guru (1986)
 Sunil Vayassu 20 (1986)
 Doore Doore Oru Koodu Koottam (1986)
 Meenamaasathile Sooryan (1986) as Jailer
 Rajavinte Makan (1986)
 Moonnu Maasangalku Munpu (1986)
 Sukhamo Devi (1986)
 Aayiram Kannukal (1986)
 Oru Kudakkeezhil (1985) as Adv Vishvanatha Menon
 Boeing Boeing (1985)
 Eeran Sandhya (1985)
 Yathra (1985)
 Muhurtham 11.30 (1985)
 Principal Olivil (1985)
 Adaminte Vaariyellu (1984)
 Piriyilla Naam (1984)
 Umanilayam (1984) as Raveendranath
 Sandarbham (1984)
Kodathi (1984) as Advocate
 Minimol Vathikkaanil (1984)
Swapname Ninakku Nandi (1983) as Johny
 Thuranna Jail (1982) as Kuttan Pilla
 John Jaffer Janardhanan (1982)
 Ahimsa (1981)
 Kolilakkam(1981)
 Thaaraavu (1981) as Thevan
 Arangum Aniyarayum (1980) as Prathapan
 Naayaattu (1980)
 Eden Thottam (1980)
 Karimbana (1980)
 Theenalangal (1980) as Damodharan master
 Angadi (1980)
 Sudhikalasam (1979)
 Driver Madyapichirunnu (1979)
 Chuvanna Chirakukal (1979)
 Kaayalum Kayarum (1979)
 Indradhanussu (1979)
 Enikku Njaan Swantham (1979) as Naanu
Irumbazhikal (1979) as School Master
Tharangam (1979) as Varghese
 Maattoly (1978)
 Nakshathrangale Kaaval (1978)
 Rowdy Ramu (1978)
 Kaithappoo (1978)
 Muhoorthangal (1977)
 Itha Ivide Vare (1977)
 Agninakshathram (1977)
Vidarunna Mottukal (1977) as Sulu's husband
 Rathimanmadhan (1977)
 Hridayam Oru Kshethram (1976)
 Panchami (1976) as Kannan
 Priyamulla Sophia (1975)
 Bhaarya Illaatha Raathri (1975)
 Penpada (1975) as Ramdas
 Velicham Akale (1975)
 Neelakkannukal (1974)
 Nadeenadanmaare Aavasyamundu (1974)
 Swargaputhri (1973) as Thampi
 Professor (1972) as Hostel Warden
 Kochaniyathi (1971) as Reghu 
 Madhuvidhu (1970)

References

External links

K P A C Sunny at MSI

Indian male film actors
Male actors from Kerala
Male actors from Kollam
People from Kollam district
Male actors in Malayalam cinema
1934 births
2006 deaths
20th-century Indian male actors
21st-century Indian male actors
Recipients of the Kerala Sangeetha Nataka Akademi Award